Amaidhi Padai is a 1994 Indian Tamil-language political action film, written and directed by Manivannan. Sathyaraj played a dual role as father and son in the film, with Ranjitha playing the female lead. The story revolves around an ordinary man Ammavasai who builds his political career through shortcuts and unethical means, while his son grows up to be an honest law enforcer. The film was followed by the sequel Nagaraja Cholan MA, MLA in 2013, also starring Sathyaraj. It went on to run more than 25 weeks and was declared a blockbuster. This film is touted as one of Sathyaraj's best performances and over years has developed a strong cult following.

Plot 
In 1967, Amavasai is a lazy transient man, but he is also rather shrewd. He gets acquainted with politician Manimaran aka Mani, a MLA of the Palladam constituency, near Tiruppur. Amavasai helps Mani with some petty tasks during his election campaign. He later becomes Mani's close associate. Meanwhile, Amavasai lusts after a beautiful village belle Thayamma and manages to entrap her with false promises of love. One day, he drugs and rapes the barely conscious Thayamma.

In 1971, Mani's party refuses to give him the ticket. An enraged Mani instructs Amavasai to stand for the MLA election as an independent candidate to teach his party a lesson. Amavasai ends up winning the election. He changes his name to Nagaraja Cholan to elevate his social status. His behavior also changes as he grows more arrogant much to the shock of Mani. He wins the election and forces Mani to become his crony.

Amavasai finds out that a rich zamindar is looking for a groom for his daughter, Sivakami and he quickly arranges to be married to her as he wants to become rich. He abandons the now pregnant Thayamma. Distraught over this betrayal,  Thayamma and her parents move out of the village to avoid humiliation. Soon, Thayamma gives birth to a boy and dies. Amavasai marries Sivakami and gets the latter's palace as dowry. Sivakami vows to be celibate as Amavasai refused to adopt Thayamma's infant son.

Over the years, Amavasai grows into a highly influential and corrupt politician. He builds a strong political network through shortcuts. He has been reelected to his position as MLA for 5 elections. To remain in power, he kills anyone who comes in his way. His ultimate goal is to become Chief Minister where he will have all the power to do whatever he wants, and no one can stop him.

Raised by his maternal grandparents, Thayamma's son, Thangavel becomes a Reserve Police constable who is deputed to Amavasai's constituency. Thangavel is betrothed to a girl studying in +2, Kuyili. They fall in love, but during their engagement event, a dispute arises as people ask about Thangavel's father's identity, and the wedding is cancelled. An enraged Thangavel asks his grandparents about his father, but they remain silent. He accuses his mother of being characterless to which his grandfather slaps him and tells him about Amavasai. Upon learning the truth about his real father and his corruption which led to the betrayal and death of his mother, Thangavel seeks revenge.

Simultaneously, the state assembly is about to be dissolved earlier to hold the general elections. Amavasai realizes that even if the party nominates him, the voters will not support him as they are fed up with his corrupted ways. He instigates a caste-based riot in his constituency and pretends to stop it, so that the people will re-elect him. A police inspector, who belongs to the Dalit caste is burned alive, and the riot intensifies.

Thangavel is posted as the riot police's head constable where he has to protect Amavasai. Thangavel saves Amavasai from an assassination attempt. Later, he goes to Amavasai's house and reveals his identity. He challenges his father that he will stop all his illegal activities and kill him. Amavasai brushes off his threats.

Thangavel is transferred to regular police and gets posted as a Sub-Inspector in the same area. Thangavel meets Sivakami and realizes she is a good woman. He begins to see her as a motherly figure in his life. They decide to plot Amavasai's downfall together. Thangavel informs CBI of the activities of Amavasai while Sivakami plans to testify against Amavasai. Amavasai learns of this and plans to kill both.  Sivakami is murdered by Amavasai's henchman and Thangavel is unable to save her. During her funeral, Amavasai acts as a grieving widower which enrages Thangavel who beats Amavasai up in public. Thangavel is arrested and jailed.

A crooked tantric advises Amavasai to get remarried to a young girl to ensure his re-election. He kidnaps Kuyili and her younger sister. He forces Kuyili in agreeing to marry him by threatening to kill her younger sister. He then takes part in a tantric wedding ritual where his hair is tonsured, and he gets dressed in saffron robes indicating that he has to be a sadhu before his wedding.

Hearing this, Thangavel escapes from prison. He finds his father's lair where he rescues the girls and stops the tantric rituals. After fighting Amavasai and his henchmen, Thangavel holds Amavasai at gunpoint. Amavasai begs Thangavel to spare his life. But remembering all the atrocities committed by his father, including the deaths of his mother and stepmother, Thangavel guns Amavasai down in a hail of bullets. In his dying moments, Amavasai finally relents and wishes his son happiness in life.

Cast 

Sathyaraj as Ammavasai (later MLA Nagaraja Cholan)/Inspector Thangavel
Manivannan as ex-MLA Manimaran
Ranjitha as Kuyili 
Kasthuri as Thayamma
Sujatha as Sivakami
Malaysia Vasudevan as Kuyili's father
C. R. Saraswathi as Kuyili's mother
Baby Aarthi as Kuyili's sister
Meesai Murugesan as Sivakami's father
S. S. Chandran as Thayamma's father
Ganthimathi as Thayamma's mother
Halwa Vasu as Ammavasai's assistant
Rambo Rajkumar
R. Sundarrajan
Indraja
Vichithra
Thyagu
S. K. Muthukumar
Viswanath
Tirupur Ramasamy
Vellai Subbaiah as Astrologer
Seeman (uncredited)

Production 
Sathyaraj was enjoying good success as a lead actor, when his friend Manivannan narrated the script of Amaidhi Padai to him. He initially considered rejecting the script as he was not interested in playing a negative role. But after being impressed by the narration, he accepted to play the role.

Soundtrack 
The music was composed by Ilaiyaraaja, while the lyrics were written by Vaali, Pulamaipithan and Ponnadiyan.

Reception 
Amaidhi Padai was released on 13 January 1994, the week of Pongal. Despite facing competition from other Pongal releases like Mahanadhi, Sethupathi IPS and Veetla Visheshanga, it emerged a major success. Malini Mannath of The Indian Express praised Sathyaraj's character and his performance. K. Vijiyan of New Straits Times wrote "A pretty much straight-forward story but it is Manivannan's super handling and interesting dialogues that place this movie above the average". Thulasi of Kalki felt the film's story was similar to Mr. Bharath, only the screenplay and dialogues were different, praised the performances of Sathyaraj and Manivannan but felt Sundarrajan and Ranjitha were underutilised and found stunts as childish and also there were too many songs but the background music was superb.

Sequel 
Manivannan directed the sequel of the film titled Nagaraja Cholan MA, MLA (2013) with Sathyaraj reprising the role of Amavasai. Sathyaraj again reprised the role in Tughlaq Durbar (2021).

Remakes 
Amaidhi Padai was remade in Telugu as M. Dharmaraju M.A. (1994), and in Hindi as Jallaad (1995).

References

External links 
 

1994 films
Films scored by Ilaiyaraaja
Tamil films remade in other languages
1990s Tamil-language films
Films directed by Manivannan
Indian films about revenge
Indian action films
Political action films